The following list is a discography of production by DJ Khalil, an American hip hop and R&B record producer. It includes a list of songs produced, co-produced and remixed by year, artist, album and title.

Singles produced

1998

Pyro
"Propaganda /bw Status Quotient" (12 Inch single)

2000

Self Scientific - The Self Science
 Entire Album

Planet Asia - 20,000 Leagues Under The Street
 "It's On"

Ras Kass - Revenge of the Spit
"Fire Wit Fire"

DJ Muggs - Soul Assassins II
"Millennium Thrust"

2001

Ras Kass - Van Gogh
 "Kiss U" 
 "Van Gogh"

Rasco - Hostile Environment
"Sunshine (Ayanna)"
"Thin Line"

2002

Ras Kass - Goldyn Child
 "Kiss of Death"

2003

G-Unit - Beg For Mercy
 "Lay You Down"

Keith Murray - He's Keith Murray
 "Candi Bar"

Raekwon - The Lex Diamond Story
 "Ice Cream Part 2"

2004

Apathy - Where's Your Album?!!
"Doe For Clothes"

DJ Muggs  - The Last Assassin
"Jealousy"

Phil da Agony - The Aromatic Album
"Promises"
"Thousand Words"
"I Can't Believe"
"For the City"

Raptile  - Classic Material
"Make Y'all Bounce"

Xzibit - Weapons of Mass Destruction
"Crazy Ho" 
"Beware of Us" 
"Judgement Day"
"Klack"

2005

Self Scientific - Change
 Entire Album

Cypress Hill - Greatest Hits from the Bong
"The Only Way"

Living Legends - Classic
"Brand New"
"Never Fallin'"

Talib Kweli - Right About Now: The Official Sucka Free Mix CD
"Two & Two"

Tony Yayo - Thoughts of a Predicate Felon
"I'm So High"

Various artists - Music from and Inspired by The Motion Picture Get Rich or Die Tryin' 
 "We Both Think Alike"

LMNO - P's and Q's
"Clutch"
"Disguises"

SonGodSuns - Over the Counter Culture
"Big Beat Walkthrough" 
"I Didn't Mean to Touch Your Hand"

Sway & King Tech - Back 2 Basics
"Better Days"

2006

Naledge - Will Rap for Food
"Cold Outside"
"Jook It"

Xzibit - Full Circle
"Poppin' Off"

The Game - Doctor's Advocate
"Da Shit"
"My B****" (Leftover track)

Jay-Z - Kingdom Come
"I Made It"

Mitchy Slick - Urban Survival Syndrome
"Mitchy Slick"
"Superstar (Amnesia)" 
"Triumphant Gangster" 
"U.S.S."

Mos Def - True Magic
"Dollar Day (Surprise, Surprise)"

Sinful aKa El Pecador - Behind 16 Bars (Hosted By DJ Warrior)
"Polvo Maldito"
"The Essence"

2007

Bishop Lamont - Nigger Noize
"Super Freak"
"Hood Psalm"

Bishop Lamont - The Pope Mobile
 "Personal Chauffeur" 
Leftover
 "Down"

Bishop Lamont & Black Milk - Caltroit
 "On Top Now"
 "Inconvenient Truth"

Talib Kweli - Eardrum
 "Oh My Stars"
 "Hostile Gospel Part 2 (Deliver Me)"

Evidence - The Weatherman LP
"All Said & Done"

50 Cent - Curtis
 "I'll Still Kill"

X-Clan - Return From Mecca
"Voodoo"
"3rd Eyes on Me"

Taje - Hot Box: The Second Hit
 "Shots Fired"

Strong Arm Steady - Deep Hearted
"Bloody Money" 
"Come and Get Me" 
"Wreckless Words"

2008

Jim Jones - Harlem's American Gangster
"Love Me No More"

Nas - The Nigger Tape
"Esco Let's Go"

Bun B - II Trill
"Another Soldier"

The New Royales
"Posers"

Bishop Lamont - The Confessional
"City Lights" 
"Send a Nigga Home" 
"Can't Figure It Out"

Strong Arm Steady
"Night After Night (Stripper Pole)"

Indef - The Project
"End Of The World"

Self Scientific
"Everywhere I Go" 
"For the J's"

Hot Dollar
"Night Life (We Up In the Club)"

Krondon
 "A Million"

Chino XL
"I'm Coming"
"Warning"
"Mama Told Me"

2009

DJ Drama - Gangsta Grillz: The Album (Vol. 2)
"Yacht Music"

T.I.
 "This Is Detox (I Am Hip Hop)"

Clipse - Til the Casket Drops
"Kinda Like a Big Deal" 
"There Was A Murder"  
"Footsteps"

Bishop Lamont
"If You Don't Know The Code"

Cashis - The Art of Dying
"Jus Anutha Day"

Defari - Work Hard, Play Harder
"Show Some Luv"

The Game
"Better on the Other Side"

Self Scientific
"It's On"
"Jetski"

Slaughterhouse - Slaughterhouse
 "The One" 
 "Cuckoo"

Fabolous - Loso's Way
"Imma Do It" 
"Never Let It Go"

50 Cent - Before I Self Destruct
"Could've Been You"

Pitbull - Rebelution
"Can't Stop Me Now"

Drake - So Far Gone EP
"Fear"

Bishop Lamont & Indef - Team America: F*ck Yeah
"The Big Payback"

2010

Cypress Hill - Rise Up
"Pass the Dutch"  
"Take My Pain"  
"Strike the Match"

Kida - The Endemic
"Street Music" 
"Wanna Be's"  
"Eulogy"

Roc C - Scapegoat
"Turn It Up"

Eminem - Recovery
"Talkin' 2 Myself" 
"Won't Back Down" 
"25 to Life"
"Almost Famous"

Laws - 4:57
 "Hold You Down"

Xzibit - MMX
"Gotta Get 'Em"

DJ Muggs & Ill Bill - Kill Devil Hills
"Luciferian Imperium"

Redman - Reggie
"Def Jammable"

Hot Dollar
"I Promise You"

M.E.D. - Bang Ya Head
"West Iz Back"

Game - Brake Lights
"Trading Places"

Dr. Dre - Detox
"Kush" 
"Die Hard"

Self Scientific
"Peaceful"

Chin - D'Tach
"Separated" 
"Mask on My Face (Remix)"

2011

Raekwon - Shaolin vs. Wu-Tang
 "Rock' N Roll" 
 "Rock' N Roll (Remix)"

Strong Arm Steady - Arms & Hammers
 "Klack Or Get Klacked"
 "Gangsta’s" 
 "When Darkness Falls"

Joell Ortiz - Free Agent
 "Cocaine"

Snoop Dogg - Doggumentary
 "I Don't Need No Bitch"

Game - The R.E.D. Album
 "Drug Test" 
 "Ricky"

New Boyz - Too Cool To Care
"Tough Kids"

Bad Meets Evil - Hell: The Sequel
"Echo"

Thurzday - L.A. Riot
"Two Clips"  
"Riot"

DJ Khaled - We the Best Forever
"Rock' N Roll (Remix)"

Professor Green - At Your Inconvenience
 "Nightmares"

50 Cent - The Big 10
"Shootin' Guns"

Rapper Big Pooh - Dirty Pretty Things
 "5.13.11"
 "Make It Thru"

2012

Pink - The Truth About Love
 "Here Comes the Weekend"

Lecrae - Gravity
 "Mayday"

Skyzoo - A Dream Deferred
 "Realization" 
 "The Rage of Roemello"

Kendrick Lamar - good kid, m.A.A.d city
"County Building Blues"

Bo da Goodfella - Drama Tracks
 "Live from the Garden"

2013

KRDN - Everything's Nothing
"Lean on Me"

Self Scientific
 "Mercy" 
 "Willie Lynchin"

Eminem - The Marshall Mathers LP 2
"Survival"

Bun B - Trill OG: The Epilogue
"No Competition"

Dom Kennedy - Get Home Safely
"If It Don't Make Money"

2014

Aloe Blacc - Lift Your Spirit
"Wake Me Up"
"The Man" 
"Soldier in the City"
"Here Today"
"Lift Your Spirit"
"Red Velvet Seat"
"Can You Do This"
"Eyes of a Child"

Logic - Under Pressure
02. "Soul Food"

Big K.R.I.T. - Cadillactica
04. "Cadillactica"

2015

Fashawn - The Ecology
03. "Something to Believe In"

Wale - The Album About Nothing
13. "The Matrimony"

ASAP Rocky - At. Long. Last. ASAP
01. "Holy Ghost"

Various Artists - Southpaw (Music from and Inspired By the Motion Picture)
 02. "Kings Never Die" 
 03. "Beast (Southpaw Remix)"

Dr. Dre - Compton
 05. "All in a Day's Work"

The Game - The Documentary 2.5
 09. "Intoxicated" 
 15. "Moment of Violence"

Raury - All We Need
7. "Peace Prevail"

Horseshoe Gang - Knocking On Raps Door
 01. "Fist Pump Music"

2016

Anderson .Paak - Malibu
 02. "Heart Don't Stand a Chance"
 12. "Your Prime"

BJ the Chicago Kid - In My Mind
 02. "Man Down"

French Montana - Wave Gods
 04. "Figure It Out"

Royce da 5'9" - Layers
 09. "Flesh"
 11. "Misses"

ASAP Ferg - Always Strive and Prosper
 01. "Rebirth" 
 05. "Psycho" 
 11. "Beautiful People" 
 18. "Grandma"

Bishop Lamont - The Reformation G.D.N.I.A.F.T.
 01. "Intro - Then You Die" 
 02. "Found a Way Out" 
 05. "Shoot Em Up" 
 08. "Lord In Heaven" 
 16. "Devil In My Way"

Nipsey Hussle - Slauson Boy 2
 00. "Ocean Views"
 00. "One Hunnit"

2017

Joey Bada$$ - All-Amerikkkan Bada$$
 01. "Good Morning Amerikkka"
 02. "For My People" - co-produced with 1-900
 12. "Amerikkkan Idol"

Guess Who - Un Anonim Celebru
 01. "Un Anonim Celebru"

A$AP Ferg
 "East Coast" - co-produced with Tariq Beats

A$AP Ferg - Still Striving
 12. "East Coast (Remix)" (featuring Busta Rhymes, ASAP Rocky, Dave East, French Montana, Rick Ross and Snoop Dogg) - co-produced with Tariq Beats

Big Boi - Boomiverse
 "Mic Jack" (featuring Adam Levine, Scar and Sleepy Brown) - co-produced with DJ Dahi

Logic - Everybody
 08. "Mos Definitely" - co-produced with C-Sick
 12. "Black Spiderman" (featuring Damian Lemar Hudson) - co-produced with Logic and 6ix

Ledisi - Let Love Rule
 02. "Shot Down"

Lecrae - All Things Work Together
 08. "Lucked Up” (feat. Nija) - co-produced with Mike & Keys and Tariq Beats

Big K.R.I.T. - 4eva Is a Mighty Long Time
 Disc One - 10. "Aux Cord"
 Disc Two - 01. "Justin Scott"
 Disc Two - 11. "Bury Me in Gold"

Eminem - Revival
 18. "Castle"

2018

SiR - November
 01. "Gone"
 09. "Better"

Joey Purp - QUARTERTHING
 02. "Godbody Pt. 2" (featuring RZA)

Nick Grant - Dreamin' Out Loud
 14. "The Ode" (featuring Sonyae Elise)

Payroll Giovanni & Cardo - Big Bossin Vol. 2 
 "5's And 6's" (Produced With Cardo)

Nipsey Hussle - Victory Lap
 02. "Rap Niggas" - co-produced with Mike & Keys and Rance
 09. "Succa Proof" (featuring Konshens & J-Black) - co-produced with Mike & Keys and Rance

Logic - Bobby Tarantino II
 06. "Indica Badu" (featuring Wiz Khalifa) - co-produced with 6ix and Kevin Randolph
 10. "State of Emergency" (featuring 2 Chainz) - co-produced with Tariq Beats and Vontae Thomas

Big K.R.I.T - TDT 

 02. "Learned From Texas" - co-produced with Tariq Beats

Various Artists - Spider-Man: Into the Spider-Verse (soundtrack) 
 12. "Elevate" -  (featuring Denzel Curry, YBN Cordae, SwaVay and Trevor Rich)

2019

Samm Henshaw
 "Rise" (from the Godfather of Harlem soundtrack)

Celine Dion - Courage
 14. "How Did You Get Here" (co-writer only)

References

External links
 
 

 
Discographies of American artists
Hip hop discographies
Production discographies